Plumper Sound is a sound in the Southern Gulf Islands region of British Columbia, Canada, located between Saturna Island (E) and North and South Pender Islands.

Plumper Sound should not be confused with Plumper Cove, 
a small cove that is home to the Plumper Cove Marine Provincial Park on Keats Island, 
also named after HMS Plumper.

See also
 Port Browning, British Columbia

References

Landforms of the Gulf Islands
Sounds of British Columbia